Bugs Bunny Builders is an American animated television series produced by Warner Bros. Animation, based on the characters from Looney Tunes. The series aired on July 25, 2022 on Cartoon Network on their Cartoonito preschool block and was released on July 26 on HBO Max.  It is the second pre-school program in the Looney Tunes franchise, following Baby Looney Tunes in 2002.

Plot 
The Looney Builders, managed by Bugs Bunny, help their friends and neighbors around the town of Looneyburg. By working together as a team, Lola Bunny, Daffy Duck, Porky Pig, Tweety, and others use their tools and wild vehicles to pull off some of the looniest construction jobs ever.

Voice cast 

 Eric Bauza as Bugs Bunny, Daffy Duck, Tweety, Marvin the Martian
 Chandni Parekh as Lola Bunny
 Bob Bergen as Porky Pig, Cecil Turtle
 Jeff Bergman as Sylvester, Foghorn Leghorn
 Alex Cazares as Petunia Pig
 Fred Tatasciore as Taz, Gossamer
 Keith Ferguson as Wile E. Coyote
 Debi Derryberry as Hippety Hopper and Pouncy (credited as Looney Kangaroo Kid and Looney Cat Kid)
 Dawson Griffin as Sniffles
 Andrew Morgado as George P. Mandrake
 Candi Milo as Pauleen Penguin, Gertie Mouse
 Max Mittelman and Noshir Dalal (respectively) as Mac and Tosh Gopher
 Charlie Townstead as Bizzy Buzzard 
 Zehra Fazal as Brenda Buzzard 
 David Shaughnessy as Hoots Talon 
 Kari Wahlgren as Ruthie Mouse 
 Ben Diskin as Tibs Squirrel
 Frank Todaro as Hector the Bulldog

Episodes
<onlyinclude>

Shorts
<onlyinclude>

International broadcast

The series premiered on Cartoonito in Latin America on December 1, 2022, as part of its launch.

The series premiered on Boomerang in Portugal on November 20, 2022, as part of its Cartoonito block.

The series premiered on Cartoonito in the UK and Ireland on November 4, 2022.

Reception
The show gained positive reception from critics. Tierra Carpenter of WISH-TV says "Tapping into parents’ nostalgia, “Bugs Bunny Builders” is THE show parents have been waiting for to introduce their favorite Looney Tunes characters to their kids. The show is designed to be funny on two levels, allowing kids to laugh along with these characters while also enticing parents to stay in the room and watch together."

References

Notes

External links
 

2020s American animated television series
2020s American children's comedy television series
2020s American workplace comedy television series
2020s preschool education television series
2022 American television series debuts
American children's animated comedy television series
American preschool education television series
Animated preschool education television series
Animated television series reboots
Slapstick comedy
Looney Tunes television series
Bugs Bunny
Wile E. Coyote and the Road Runner
English-language television shows
HBO Max original programming
Cartoon Network original programming
Animated television series about rabbits and hares
Animated television series about ducks
Animated television series about pigs
Animated television series about cats
Animated television series about birds
Animated television series about children
Television shows set in the United States
Television series set in 2022
Television series by Warner Bros. Animation